A randan is a boat rowed by three persons, stern and bow using a single oar each and the central person a pair of sculls. The word is of unknown origin, and can hardly be connected with a slang term for a row or spree, which is found as early as the beginning of the 18th century and is generally taken as a variation of random, haphazard.

References

Rowing boats